Lower Kurram Tehsil is a subdivision located in Kurram District, Khyber Pakhtunkhwa, Pakistan. The population is 136,719 according to the 2017 census.

History 

In March 2017, two people were killed in a US drone strike in the Sara Khwa area of Lower Kurram. This was the first drone strike in Pakistan under the administration of United States President Donald Trump.

See also 
 Sadda, FATA
 List of tehsils of Khyber Pakhtunkhwa

References 

Tehsils of Khyber Pakhtunkhwa
Populated places in Kurram District